Sasi is an Indian and Nepali male and female name, abstracted from ancient Sanskrit language, meaning "Moon". It is commonly used in India in various masculine and feminine given names.

Sasi may refer to:

People 
Sasi (usurper), 7th century BC usurper in the Assyrian Empire
I. V. Sasi (born 1948), Malayali Indian film director
Sasi (director) (born 1968), director of Tamil films
Sasi Shanker (1957–2016), director of Tamil and Malayali films
A nickname for Indian chess Grandmaster Krishnan Sasikiran

Other 
 Sasi, Croatia, a village near Velika Gorica
 Sași, the Romanian term for Transylvanian Saxons
 Sasi language, a dialect of ǂʼAmkoe language of Botswana
 Saxons in medieval Serbia, known as Sasi

See also
 SASI (disambiguation)
 Shashi (disambiguation)
 Sassi Punnu (disambiguation)